Hallelujah Peak, also known as Peak 12590, is located in the Bighorn Mountains in the U.S. state of Wyoming. The peak is the fifth-highest in the range and it is in the Cloud Peak Wilderness of Bighorn National Forest.

References

Mountains of Johnson County, Wyoming
Mountains of Wyoming
Bighorn National Forest